Spectacular may refer to:
 "Spectacular" (Graham Coxon song), a 2004 song by Graham Coxon
 "Spectacular" (Kiely Williams song), the 2010 debut single by Kiely Williams
 Spectacular (album), a 2012 album by ZE:A
 Spectacular!, a 2009 television movie produced by Nickelodeon
 Spectacular (singer) (born 1976), Jamaican reggae artist
 Restoration spectacular, an elaborately staged "machine play" popular in Restoration-era London
 "Spectacular" Blue Smith, a member of Pretty Ricky
 Spectacular mark, a term for a type of mark in Australian rules football

See also
 Spectacle, refers to an event that is memorable for the appearance it creates